Events in the year 1047 in Norway.

Incumbents
 Monarchs – Magnus the Good, Harald Hardrada

Events
25 October - Magnus the Good dies, ending the personal union with Denmark. Harald Hardrada becomes King of Norway and Sweyn Estridsson becomes King of Denmark.

Arts and literature

Births

Deaths
25 October - Magnus the Good, King of Norway 1035–1047 (born 1024).

References

Norway